Perak is one of the states in Malaysia that awards honours and titles.

2010

 Muhyiddin Yassin is the sole recipient of Darjah Kebesaran Seri Paduka Sultan Azlan Shah (SPSA), which carries the title Dato' Seri Diraja.
 Zaki Azmi is the sole recipient of Darjah Seri Paduka Cura Si Manja Kini (SPCM), which carries the title Dato' Seri.
 3 recipients of Darjah Seri Panglima Taming Sari (SPTS), which carries the title Dato' Seri Panglima.
 4 recipients of Darjah Seri Paduka Mahkota Perak (SPMP), which carries the title Dato' Seri.
 7 recipients of Darjah Datuk Paduka Cura Simanja Kini (DPCM), which carries the title Dato.
 3 recipients of Darjah Datuk Pahlawan Taming Sari (DPTS), which carries the title Dato' Pahlawan.
 46 recipients of Darjah Datuk Paduka Mahkota Perak (DPMP), which carries the title Dato.

2009
 2 recipients of Darjah Seri Panglima Taming Sari (SPTS), which carries the title Dato' Seri Panglima.
 4 recipients of Darjah Seri Paduka Mahkota Perak (SPMP), which carries the title Dato' Seri.
 2 recipients of Darjah Datuk Paduka Cura Simanja Kini (DPCM), which carries the title Dato.
 9 recipients of Darjah Datuk Pahlawan Taming Sari (DPTS), which carries the title Dato' Pahlawan.
 33 recipients of Darjah Datuk Paduka Mahkota Perak (DPMP), which carries the title ''Dato.

2007
 1 recipient of Darjah Seri Paduka Cura Si Manja Kini (SPCM), which carries the title Dato' Seri.
 1 recipient of Darjah Seri Panglima Taming Sari (SPTS), which carries the title Dato' Seri Panglima.
 4 recipients of Darjah Seri Paduka Mahkota Perak (SPMP), which carries the title Dato' Seri.
 3 recipients of Darjah Datuk Paduka Cura Simanja Kini (DPCM), which carries the title Dato.
 9 recipients of Darjah Datuk Pahlawan Taming Sari (DPTS), which carries the title Dato' Pahlawan.
 40 recipients of Darjah Datuk Paduka Mahkota Perak (DPMP), which carries the title Dato.

2006
 1 recipient of Darjah Seri Panglima Taming Sari (SPTS), which carries the title Dato' Seri Panglima.
 6 recipients of Darjah Seri Paduka Mahkota Perak (SPMP), which carries the title Dato' Seri.
 3 recipients of Darjah Datuk Paduka Cura Simanja Kini (DPCM), which carries the title Dato.
 6 recipients of Darjah Datuk Pahlawan Taming Sari (DPTS), which carries the title Dato' Pahlawan.
 44 recipients of Darjah Datuk Paduka Mahkota Perak (DPMP), which carries the title Dato.

2005
 1 recipient of Darjah Seri Panglima Taming Sari (SPTS), which carries the title Dato' Seri Panglima.
 5 recipients of Darjah Seri Paduka Mahkota Perak (SPMP), which carries the title Dato' Seri.
 2 recipients of Darjah Datuk Paduka Cura Simanja Kini (DPCM), which carries the title Dato.
 7 recipients of Darjah Datuk Pahlawan Taming Sari (DPTS), which carries the title Dato' Pahlawan.
 31 recipients of Darjah Datuk Paduka Mahkota Perak (DPMP), which carries the title ''Dato.

2004
 1 recipient of Darjah Kebesaran Seri Paduka Sultan Azlan Shah (SPSA), which carries the title Dato' Seri.
 3 recipients of Darjah Seri Panglima Taming Sari (SPTS), which carries the title Dato' Seri Panglima.
 1 recipients of Darjah Seri Paduka Mahkota Perak (SPMP), which carries the title Dato' Seri.
 23 recipients of Darjah Datuk Paduka Mahkota Perak (DPMP), which carries the title Dato.

2003
 Abdullah Ahmad Badawi is sole recipient of Darjah Kebesaran Seri Paduka Sultan Azlan Shah (SPSA), which carries the title Dato' Seri.
 2 recipients of Darjah Seri Panglima Taming Sari (SPTS), which carries the title Dato' Seri Panglima.
 3 recipients of Darjah Seri Paduka Mahkota Perak (SPMP), which carries the title Dato' Seri.
 3 recipients of Darjah Datuk Paduka Cura Simanja Kini (DPCM), which carries the title Dato.
 6 recipients of Darjah Datuk Pahlawan Taming Sari (DPTS), which carries the title Dato' Pahlawan.
 40 recipients of Darjah Datuk Paduka Mahkota Perak (DPMP), which carries the title ''Dato.

2000
 2 recipients of Datuk Seri Paduka Sultan Azlan (SPSA), which carries the title Dato' Seri.
 8 recipients of Darjah Seri Paduka Mahkota Perak (SPMP), which carries the title Dato' Seri.
 4 recipients of Datuk Paduka Cura Simanja Kini (DPCM), which carries the title Dato'''.
 8 recipients of Darjah Datuk Pahlawan Taming Sari (DPTS), which carries the title Dato' Pahlawan.
 42 recipients of Darjah Datuk Paduka Mahkota Perak (DPMP), which carries the title Dato.

External links
 The Star - Sultan of Perak 82nd birthday honours list, 21 April 2010.
 The Star - Perak Sultan’s 81st Birthday Honours List, 24 April 2009.
 The Star - Sultan of Perak's Birthday Honours List 2007, 23 April 2007.
 The Star - Perak Sultan’s 78th Birthday Honours List, 22 April 2006.
 The Star - Sultan of Perak's birthday honours list, 27 April 2005.
 The Star - Sultan of Perak's birthday honours list, 20 April 2004.
The Star - Sultan of Perak's birthday honours list, 21 April 2003.
The Star - Sultan of Perak's brother heads honours list, 18 April 2000.

Malaysian honours list
Perak